Aleksandr Pavlovich Palchikov (born 23 October 1979) is a former Russian professional football player who played as a striking midfielder.

Club career
He played two seasons in the Russian Football National League for FC Fakel Voronezh.

References

1979 births
Footballers from Voronezh
Living people
Russian footballers
Association football midfielders
FC Fakel Voronezh players
FC Elista players